The Boulder Bridge is a historic bridge located in the Washington, D.C. portion of Rock Creek Park, an urban national park listed on the National Register of Historic Places.

Boulder Bridge was constructed in 1902 and carries Beach Drive across Rock Creek, a tributary of the Potomac River. The reinforced concrete arch bridge was designed by architect W. J. Douglas and was built at a cost of $17,636.

Boulder Bridge and Ross Drive Bridge were added to the National Register of Historic Places on March 20, 1980. In addition, the bridges are contributing properties to the Rock Creek Park Historic District.

See also
 List of bridges on the National Register of Historic Places in Washington, D.C.
 National Register of Historic Places listings in the District of Columbia
 Rock Creek and Potomac Parkway

References

External links
	
 

Arch bridges in the United States
Bridges completed in 1902
Road bridges on the National Register of Historic Places in Washington, D.C.
Bridges over Rock Creek (Potomac River tributary)
Individually listed contributing properties to historic districts on the National Register in Washington, D.C.
Concrete bridges in the United States